Park is an independent comedy drama film written and directed by Kurt Voelker in his feature directorial debut. It stars William Baldwin, Anne Dudek, Ricki Lake, Melanie Lynskey, Izabella Miko, Trent Ford, Dagney Kerr, Maulik Pancholy, Francesco Quinn, Cheri Oteri, and Treach. The story revolves around a group of colorful characters whose lives intertwine over the course of one day in a Los Angeles public park.

Park was given the Audience Award at the 8th annual CineVegas Festival, where it premiered in June 2006. It had  a limited theatrical run in 2007. The film received a mixed reception from critics.

Main cast
William Baldwin – Dennis
Ricki Lake – Peggy
Cheri Oteri – Claire
Melanie Lynskey – Sheryl
Izabella Miko – Krysta
Anne Dudek – Meredith
Trent Ford – Nathan
Maulik Pancholy – Babar
Dagney Kerr – April
Anthony 'Treach' Criss – Darnell
Francesco Quinn – Javier

Awards
 Audience Award, CineVegas 2006
 Best Screenplay Award, Fylmz Festival 2007
 Bud Abbot Award – Best Feature Comedy, Garden State Film Festival 2007
 Audience Award, Sonoma Valley Film Festival 2007

References

External links
Official website
Myspace website

Park
2006 comedy-drama films
2006 comedy films
2006 drama films